Ysgol Henry Richard is a bilingual middle school for pupils aged 3–16 in Ceredigion, Wales. The school is a product of the amalgamation of Ysgol Llanddewi Brefi, Ysgol Gynradd Tregaron and Ysgol Uwchradd Tregaron.

The school is categorized linguistically by Welsh Government as a category 2B school, meaning that at least 80% of subjects (except Welsh and English) are taught through the medium of Welsh but are also taught through the medium of English. 57% come from Welsh-speaking homes and 88% of pupils are taught through the medium of Welsh.

References 

Secondary schools in Ceredigion